Bryonycta is a genus of moths of the family Noctuidae. The genus was erected by Charles Boursin in 1955.

Species
Bryonycta pineti (Staudinger, 1859) Spain, southern France
Bryonycta opulenta Boursin, 1957 Canary Islands

References

Bryophilinae